Ratona is a town in Sagar district of Madhya Pradesh, India.

Cities and towns in Sagar district
Sagar, Madhya Pradesh